The National Basketball League is a professional basketball minor league in China, called Chinese Basketball League (CBL) before 2006. It is commonly known as the NBL, and this name (spelled out in letters) is often used even in Chinese.

NBL is the second-tier league to the professional Chinese Basketball Association (CBA).

Teams

Current teams

Name changes 
 Anhui Jianghuai Lightning (安徽江淮闪电) --> Fujian Lightning (福建闪电) --> Anhui Putian Xingfa Lightning (安徽莆田兴发闪电)
 Beijing Capital Sports Shares Eastern Bucks (北京首体股份东方雄鹿) --> Beijing Bucks (北京雄鹿)
 Guizhou Shenghang Snow Leopards (贵州森航雪豹) --> Guizhou Guwutang Tea White Tigers (贵州古雾堂茶白虎)
 Henan Jiyuan Iron and Steel (河南济源钢铁) --> Henan Jiyuan Coal Industry Golden Elephants (河南济源煤业金象) --> Henan Shedian Laojiu Golden Elephants (河南赊店老酒金象)
 Hong Kong Xinlibao Bulls (香港新丽宝公牛) --> Shaanxi Weinan Xingda Northwestern Wolves (陕西渭南信达西北狼) --> Shaanxi Xingda Northwestern Wolves (陕西信达西北狼)
 Hunan Yongsheng (湖南勇胜) --> Hunan Jinjian Rice Industry (湖南金健米业)
 Jiangsu Guoli Qifu Lions (江苏国立汽服雄狮) --> Jiangsu Guoli Lions (江苏国立雄狮)
 Jiangsu Hualan Royal Pandas (江苏华兰皇家熊猫) --> Chongqing Sanhai Lanling Royal Pandas (重庆三海兰陵皇家熊猫) --> Chongqing Huaxi International (重庆华熙国际)
 Nanjing Military Region Yueda Great Wall (南京军区悦达长城) --> Eastern Army Yueda Great Wall (东部陆军悦达长城) --> Eastern Yuanchuang Yueda Great Wall (东部原创悦达长城) --> Nanjing Lishui Yueda Great Wall (南京溧水悦达长城) --> Hefei Yuanchuang (合肥原创)
 Zhengzhou Dayun (郑州大运) --> Luoyang Jinxing Flaming Horses (洛阳金星) --> Luoyang Zhonghe Flaming Horses (洛阳中赫) --> Luoyang Jinxing Haixiang Flaming Horses (洛阳金星海象)

Former teams

Joined the CBA 
 Yunnan Honghe Running Bulls (云南红河奔牛) – 2004, now defunct
 Dongguan New Century Leopards (东莞新世纪烈豹) – 2005
 Zhejiang Guangsha Lions (浙江广厦猛狮) – 2006
 Qingdao Conson DoubleStar Eagles (青岛国信双星雄鹰) – 2008
 Tianjin Ronggang Gold Lions (天津荣钢金狮) – 2008
 Sichuan Jinqiang Blue Whales (四川金强蓝鲸) – 2013
 Chongqing Wansheng Black Valley Fly Dragons (重庆万盛黑山谷翱龙) – 2014
 Jiangsu Tongxi Monkey Kings (江苏同曦大圣) – 2014

Name change 
 Guangzhou Free Man (广州自由人) --> Chongqing Wansheng Black Valley Fly Dragons (重庆万盛黑山谷翱龙)

Defunct teams 
 Guangzhou Whampoa Chateau Xingbao Liusui (广州黃埔星堡酒庄六穗) – 2013
 Hanzhou Yongtong (杭州永通) – 2011
 Hebei Jidong Cement (河北冀东水泥) – 
 Hebei Qingquan Running Horses (河北清泉奔马) – 2013
 Heilongjiang Daqing (黑龙江大庆) – 
 Heilongjiang Zhaozhou Fengshen Sky Lions (黑龙江肇州丰绅天狮) – 2014
 Hubei Marco Polo (湖北马可波罗) – 2014
 Hunan Changsha Bank Park Lane Snow Wolves (湖南长沙银行柏宁雪狼) – 2014
 Jiangxi Xingye Flaming Horses (江西鑫业烈焰马) – 2014
 Shanxi Yujin (山西宇晋) – 2006, merged with the Henan Renhe Dragons (河南仁和猛龙) to form Shanxi Yujin Dragons (山西宇晋猛龙)
 Shenyang Dongjin (沈阳东进) – 2011
 Sichuan Shidai Glacier (四川时代冰川) – 
 Team Tianjin (天津市男子篮球队) – no nickname or sponsor
 Weihai Xinli (威海新力) – 2013
 Yingkou Donghua Shenyang Army (营口东华沈阳部队) –

Name changes 
 Dongguan Park Lane (东莞柏宁) --> Hunan Changsha Bank Park Lane Snow Wolves (湖南长沙银行柏宁雪狼)
 Guangzhou Whampoa Liusui (广州黃埔六穗) --> Guangzhou Whampoa Chateau Xingbao Liusui (广州黃埔星堡酒庄六穗)
 Henan Renhe (河南仁和) --> Shanxi Yujin (山西宇晋)
 Team Hubei (湖北省男子篮球队) --> Hubei Marco Polo (湖北马可波罗)

History

Inaugural season 
The first regular season of the CBL began in April 2004. Eight teams advanced to the playoffs:

 Yunnan Honghe Running Bulls (云南红河奔牛)
 Yingkou Donghua Shenyang Army (营口东华沈阳部队)
 Hebei Jidong Cement (河北冀东水泥)
 Sichuan Shidai Glacier (四川时代冰川)
 Shanxi Yujin (山西宇晋)
 Heilongjiang Daqing (黑龙江大庆)
 Dongguan New Century Leopards (东莞新世纪烈豹)
 Team Tianjin (天津市男子篮球队) – no nickname or sponsor

On 4 August 2004, Yunnan Honghe Running Bulls defeated Dongguan New Century Leopards to win the first ever CBL championship and were promoted to the CBA for the 2004–2005 season.

2009 NBL ladder (championship round)

See also 
 Sport in China
 China men's national basketball team
 China women's national basketball team
 Chinese Basketball Association (CBA)
 Women's Chinese Basketball Association (WCBA)
 Chinese University Basketball Association (CUBA)
 NBL-China Scoring Leader
 NBL-China Block Leader

References

External links 
 NBL official website 

2
Sports leagues in China
Professional sports leagues in China